Rustici is an Italian surname. Notable people with the surname include: 

Cristoforo Rustici, known as il Rusticone, (1552 – 1641), Italian painter
Francesco Rustici, known as Il Rustichino (c.1592 - 1625), baroque painter of the Sienese School
Giovanni Francesco Rustici (1474-1554), Italian sculptor
Marco di Bartolomeo Rustici (c.1393 - 1457), Florentine goldsmith
Vincenzo Rustici (1556–1632) Italian painter

See also
Rustici Codex or  Codice Rustici, a miniature codex (1448-1450) saved in the library of the Grand Seminary of Florence
Rustici Engine (SCORM)
 
 
Italian-language surnames